Anastasio is both a given name and a surname. Notable people with the name include:

People with the given name
 Anastasio Alfaro (1865–1951), Costa Rican zoologist, geologist and explorer
 Anastasio Aquino (1792–1833), Salvadoran indigenous leader
 Anastasio Ballestrero (1913–1998), Italian prelate of the Roman Catholic Church
 Anastasio Bustamante (1780–1853), President of Mexico
 Anastasio Cuschieri (1872–1962), Maltese poet, politician, and philosopher
 Anastasio Somoza Debayle (1925–1980), President of Nicaragua
 Anastasio Somoza García (1896–1956), President of Nicaragua
 Anastasio Somoza Portocarrero (20th century), Nicaraguan anti-communist

People with the surname
 Albert Anastasia (1902–1957), born Albert Anastasio, American mobster
 Anthony Anastasio (1906–1963), American mobster and labor racketeer
 Armando Anastasio (born 1996), Italian footballer
 Kara Anastasio (21st century), American politician
 Michael R. Anastasio (born 1948), director of the Los Alamos National Laboratory
 Trey Anastasio (born 1964), American guitarist, composer, and vocalist
 Marco Anastasio (born 1997), simply known as Anastasio, Italian rapper and singer

See also

José Anastasio Torrens
 Anastasia
Anastacio (name)
Anastasia (surname)
Anastasius (disambiguation)